Noah Robbins is an American actor.

Background 
Robbins is a native of Washington, D.C. and graduated from Georgetown Day School in 2009. Robbins made his Broadway debut  in the 2009 production of Brighton Beach Memoirs, where he played Eugene Morris Jerome, and received an Outer Critics Circle nomination.

Filmography

Film

Television

References

External links

Living people
American male film actors
American male television actors
Georgetown Day School alumni
Male actors from Washington, D.C.
1990 births